Suehirochō Station (末広町駅(すえひろちょうえき)) is the name of four train stations in Japan.

Suehirochō Station (Kanagawa)
Suehirochō Station (Tokyo)
Suehirochō Station (Hokkaido) (tram)
Suehirochō Station (Toyama) (tram)